Général d'armée aérienne André Lanata  (born 10 October 1961, Bastia, Corsica) is a French fighter pilot and served as Chief of Staff of the French Air Force CEMAA from 21 September 2015. He was succeeded on 31 August 2018 by Philippe Lavigne. Lanata served as Commander of NATO’s Allied Command Transformation from 2018 to 2021.

Biography

André was born in Bastia, Corsica. He is the son of Général d'armée aérienne Vincent Lanata, the former French Air Force Chief from 1991 to 1994. His wife is one of the daughters of Général de brigade Jean Pichot-Duclos.

Military career

André entered the École de l'air (French Air School) in 1981.

In 1984, he became a fighter pilot on the Mirage F1C4, then in 1985 became the Squadron Commander of the  
In 1992, he was the operations chief of the  

In 1993, he was the officer auditor of the reconnaissance program at the general staff headquarters session of the French Air Force at Paris.

In 1995, he was part of the 3rd promotion of the Inter-arm Defense College.

In 1996, he was the second in command, then Commander of the  Escadron de Chasse 2/3 Champagne (EC 2/3 Champagne), on the Mirage 2000 D variant of the Aerial Base of Nancy.

In 2002, he was the Coherence Operational Officer (OCO) « preparations » at the general staff headquarters of the Armies.

From 2004 to 2006, he commanded the Aerial Base of Djibouti and commanded the French Air Components of Djibouti, along with the Inter-arm Vocational Support Base (BSVIA).

In 2006, he became the Plans Bureau Chief of the Air Force, then in 2008, he was designated as the deputy director of the International and Strategic Affairs at the SGDSN.

From 2011 until 2013, he was the assistant general to the deputy chief of operations at the general staff headquarters of the Armies (EMA).

From 2013 to 2015, he was the deputy chief of plans of the general staff headquarters of the Armies (EMA).

On 21 September 2015, he was nominated as CEMAA.

Missions 

André Lanata participated in many operations. Brevetted as a fighter pilot, he conducted 143 war missions and registered 3300 operational flight hours. Out of the sequential campaign engagement series, feature in part:

 1985,
 Opération Épervier (Tchad in 1988 and 1989),
 Operation Daguet/Desert Shield & Desert Storm (Iraq 1990/1991),
 Operation Aconit/Provide Comfort (Turkey/Iraq in 1991, 1992 and 1993),
 Operation Crécerelle/Deny Flight (Bosnia Herzegovina in 1993), 
 Operation Joint Endeavour (Ex-Yugoslavia in 1997), 
 Operation Trident/Allied Force (Kosovo in 1999 and 2000).

Promotions 
 September 1, 2008 : général de brigade aérienne
 1 September 2011 : général de division aérienne
 1 September 2013 : général de corps aérien
 21 September 2015 : général d'armée aérienne

Recognitions and honors 

Badge de chuteur qualifié de l'armée aérienne
SACT Badge
Grand Officer Order of the Légion d'honneur (2 July 2018)
Commander Order of the National Order of Merit (France) 
Croix de guerre des théâtres d'opérations extérieures with palm and bronze star 
Croix de la Valeur militaire with gilt star 
Médaille de l'Aéronautique 
Croix du Combattant 
Médaille d'Outre-Mer 
Médaille de la Défense nationale (Golden echelon) 
Medal of the Nation's Gratitude  
Médaille commémorative française 
Kuwait Liberation Medal (Saudi Arabia)
Kuwait Liberation Medal (Kuwait)
NATO Medal with bar (Former Yugoslavia)
NATO Medal with bar (Kosovo)
National Order of June 27 1977, Officer (Djibouti)
Santos-Dumont Medal of Merit (Medalha do Mérito Santos Dumont), Brazilian Air Force

See also 
Chief of the General Staff Headquarters of the Armies (French: Chef d'État-Major des Armées, CEMA) (official designation)

Notes & references

|-

1961 births
Chiefs of the Staff of the French Air and Space Force
Grand Officiers of the Légion d'honneur
Commanders of the Ordre national du Mérite
Recipients of the Cross for Military Valour
Recipients of the Aeronautical Medal
École de l'air alumni
People from Bastia
Living people